Alexander Ferguson (born 1913) was a Scottish footballer who played as an outside right for clubs including St Johnstone, Hibernian and Heart of Midlothian.

While with St Johnstone, he was selected for a Scottish Football Association tour of North America in the summer of 1935; none of the matches was considered a full international. He had earlier represented his country at Junior level while with Lochee Harp.

His spell at Hibs was a short end-of-season loan to aid the team in their fight against relegation in 1935–36, which was successful. He then signed for their Edinburgh derby rivals Hearts, where a first campaign establishing himself was followed by a goal in the first round of the 1937–38 season; he also scored in the club's next fixture against Hibs in the Wilson Cup, but then suffered a badly broken leg in the last minute of the match. Ferguson never played for Hearts again due to the injury, signing for Rochdale in 1939 after a short trial with Falkirk, but he only made one Football League appearance prior to the outbreak of World War II, with the matches played declared void.

References

1913 births
Date of birth missing
Year of death missing
Place of death missing
Scottish footballers
Footballers from Angus, Scotland
People from Monifieth
Association football outside forwards
Lochee Harp F.C. players
St Johnstone F.C. players
Heart of Midlothian F.C. players
Hibernian F.C. players
Rochdale A.F.C. players
Scottish Junior Football Association players
Scotland junior international footballers
Scottish Football League players